George Daggar (6 November 1879 – 14 October 1950) was a Labour Party politician in the United Kingdom.

He was elected at the 1929 general election as Member of Parliament (MP) for the safe Labour seat of Abertillery in Monmouthshire, Wales.  He represented the constituency in the House of Commons until his death at the age of 70, in Bedwellty, eight months after being returned to Parliament for the fifth time at the 1950 general election.  At the time he was vice-chairman of his party.

References

 

1879 births
1950 deaths
Miners' Federation of Great Britain-sponsored MPs
Welsh Labour Party MPs
UK MPs 1929–1931
UK MPs 1931–1935
UK MPs 1935–1945
UK MPs 1945–1950
UK MPs 1950–1951